Siba'a ibn Abd al-Uzza was a man that met the sahaba. He was given the job to torture Khabbab ibn al-Aratt by the leaders of Quraish. Umm Anmaar was his sister.

References

Companions of the Prophet